The Malaysian Armed Forces Council is a Malaysian military body established under Article 137 of the Constitution of Malaysia and is the constitutional body responsible (under the general authority of the King as Supreme Commander) for the command, discipline and administration of Malaysia's armed forces. It is composed of the following members;

 The Minister of Defence.
 One member appointed by the Conference of Rulers.
 The Chief of the Armed Forces Staff, who is appointed by the King of Malaysia.
 The Secretary General of Defence.
 Two senior staff officers of the army, appointed by the King.
 A senior officer of the navy, appointed by the King.
 A senior officer of the air force, appointed by the King.
 Up to two other members, appointed by the King.

Current Composition of Council Members

Permanent Members

Joint Members

Secretariat 

Source :

References

Military of Malaysia